Amen is an Abrahamic declaration of affirmation which is first found in the Hebrew Bible, and subsequently found in the New Testament. It is used in Jewish, Christian, and Muslim practices as a concluding word, or as a response to a prayer. Common English translations of the word amen include "verily", "truly", "it is true", and "let it be so". It is also used colloquially, to express strong agreement.

Pronunciations

In Anglophone North American usage, the ah-men pronunciation is used in performances of classical music and in churches with more formalized rituals and liturgy.

The ay-men pronunciation is a product of the Great Vowel Shift (i.e., it dates from the 15th century); it is associated with Irish Protestantism and with conservative evangelical denominations generally. It is also the pronunciation typically used in gospel music.

Etymology
Amen is a word of Biblical Hebrew origin. It appears many times in the Hebrew Bible as a confirmatory response, especially following blessings. The basic triconsonantal root א-מ-נ, from which the word is derived, is common to a number of languages in the Semitic branch of the Afroasiatic languages, including biblical Aramaic. Meanings of the root in Hebrew include to be firm or confirmed, to be reliable or dependable, to be faithful, to have faith, to believe. The word was imported into Greek from the Judaism of the early Church. From Greek, amen entered other European languages. According to a standard dictionary etymology of the English word, amen passed from Greek into Late Latin, and thence into English.

From Hebrew, the word was later adopted into the Arabic religious vocabulary and leveled to the Arabic root , which is of similar meanings to the Hebrew. The interjection occurs in the Christian and Islamic lexicons, most commonly in prayer, as well as secularly, albeit less commonly, so as to signify complete affirmation or deference. In religious texts, it occurs in Arabic translations of the Bible and after reciting the traditionally first chapter of the Quran, which is formally akin to religious supplications.

Popular among some theosophists, proponents of Afrocentric theories of history, and adherents of esoteric Christianity is the conjecture that amen is a derivative of the name of the Egyptian god Amun (which is sometimes also spelled Amen). Some adherents of Eastern religions believe that amen shares roots with the Hindu Sanskrit word Aum. Such external etymologies are not included in standard etymological reference works. The Hebrew word, as noted above, starts with aleph, while the Egyptian name begins with a yodh.

In French, the Hebrew word amen is sometimes translated as Ainsi soit-il, which means "So be it."

The linguist Ghil'ad Zuckermann argues that, as in the case of Hallelujah, the word amen is usually not replaced by a translation due to the speakers' belief in iconicity, their perception that there is something intrinsic about the relationship between the sound of the signifier (the word) and what it signifies (its meaning).

Hebrew Bible
The word occurs in the Hebrew Bible 30 times; in Deuteronomy alone 12 times beginning at 27:15. The fixed phrase 'Amen, Amen' is seen five times – Psalm 41:13; 72:19; 89:52; Numbers 5:22; Nehemiah 8:6. It is translated as 'of truth' two times in Isaiah 65:16. Three distinct Biblical usages of amen may be noted:
 Initial amen, referring back to words of another speaker and introducing an affirmative sentence, e.g. 1 Kings 1:36.
 Detached amen, again referring to the words of another speaker but without a complementary affirmative sentence, e.g. Nehemiah 5:13.
 Final amen, with no change of speaker, as in the subscription to the first three divisions of Psalms.

New Testament

In the New Testament, the Greek word ἀμήν is used as an expression of faith or as a part of a liturgical formula. It also may appear as an introductory word, especially in sayings of Jesus. Unlike the initial amen in Hebrew, which refers back to something already said, it is used by Jesus to emphasize what he is about to say (ἀμὴν λέγω, "truly I say to you"), a rhetorical device that has no parallel in contemporary Jewish practice. Raymond Brown says that Jesus's peculiar and authentic reminiscent use of amen in the Fourth Gospel is an affirmation that what he is about to say is an echo from the Father. The word occurs 52 times in the Synoptic Gospels; the Gospel of John has 25.

In the King James Bible, the word amen is seen in a number of contexts. Notable ones include:
 The catechism of curses of the Law found in Deuteronomy 27.
 A double amen ("amen and amen") occurs in Psalm 89 (Psalm 41:13; 72:19; 89:52), to confirm the words and invoke the fulfillment of them.
 Amen occurs in several doxology formulas in Romans 1:25, 9:5, 11:36, 15:33, and several times in Chapter 16. It also appears in doxologies in the Psalms (41:14; 72:19; 89:53; 106:48). This liturgical form from Judaism.
 It concludes all of Paul's general epistles.
 In Revelation 3:14, Jesus is referred to as, "the Amen, the faithful and true witness, the beginning of God's creation." The whole passage reads as "And unto the angel of the church of the Laodiceans write; These things saith the Amen, the faithful and true witness, the beginning of the creation of God". Notably, the text never specifically says that Jesus is the Amen. Although the letter is attributed to Jesus, the text refers to the Amen as having spoken the information that is being reported by Jesus in the letter. That the Amen is a witness, suggest some scholars, implies that the Amen is a being of some kind whose words are being referenced. 
 Amen concludes the last book of the New Testament, at Rev. 22:21.

Congregational use

Judaism

Although amen, in Judaism, is commonly used as a response to a blessing, it also is often used by Hebrew speakers as an affirmation of other forms of declaration (including outside of religious context).

Jewish rabbinical law requires an individual to say amen in a variety of contexts.
With the rise of the synagogue during the Second Temple period, amen became a common response, especially to benedictions. It is recited communally to affirm a blessing made by the prayer reader. It is also mandated as a response during the kaddish doxology.
The congregation is sometimes prompted to answer "amen" by the terms ve-'imru = "and [now] say (pl.)," or, ve-nomar (ונאמר) = "and we will say." Contemporary usage reflects ancient practice: As early as the 4th century BCE, Jews assembled in the Temple responded "amen" at the close of a doxology or other prayer uttered by a priest. This Jewish liturgical use of amen was adopted by the Christians. But Jewish law also requires individuals to answer amen whenever they hear a blessing recited, even in a non-liturgical setting.

The Talmud teaches homiletically that the word amen is an acronym for אל מלך נאמן ("God, trustworthy King"), the phrase recited silently by an individual before reciting the Shma.

Christianity
The use of "amen" has been generally adopted in Christian worship as a concluding word for prayers and hymns and an expression of strong agreement. The liturgical use of the word in apostolic times is attested by the passage from 1 Corinthians cited above, and Justin Martyr (c. 150) describes the congregation as responding "amen" to the benediction after the celebration of the Eucharist. Its introduction into the baptismal formula (in the Eastern Orthodox Church it is pronounced after the name of each person of the Trinity) was probably later.

In Isaiah 65:16, the authorized version has "the God of truth" ("the God of amen" in Hebrew). Jesus often used amen to put emphasis to his own words (translated: "verily" or "truly"). In John's Gospel, it is repeated, "Verily, verily" (or "Truly, truly"). Amen is also used in oaths (Numbers 5:22; Deuteronomy 27:15–26; Nehemiah 5:13; 8:6; 1 Chronicles 16:36) and is further found at the end of the prayer of primitive churches (1 Corinthians 14:16).

Amen is also used in standard, international French, but in Cajun French  ("so be it") is used instead.

Amen is used at the end of the Lord's Prayer, which is also called the Our Father or the Pater Noster.

In some Christian churches, the "amen corner" or "amen section" is any subset of the congregation likely to call out "Amen!" in response to points in a preacher's sermon. Metaphorically, the term can refer to any group of heartfelt traditionalists or supporters of an authority figure. The term has also been used as a place name, and as a title for musical and literary works; see Amen Corner.

Islam

ʾĀmīn is the Arabic form of Amen. In Islam, it is used with the same meaning as in Judaism and Christianity; when concluding a prayer, especially after a supplication (du'a) or reciting the first surah Al Fatiha of the Qur'an, as in prayer (salat), and as an assent to the prayers of others.

Arabic dictionaries define ʾāmīn as an imperative verbal noun, whose meaning is answer or reply (i.e., imploring God to grant one's prayer). Therefore, it is strictly used as a final amen to conclude supplications or to declare affirmation, and has no initial amen usage with the meaning of truly or certainly.

See also
Selah
Svaha
So mote it be

References

Further reading
 Schnitker, Thaddeus A. "Amen." In The Encyclopedia of Christianity, edited by Erwin Fahlbusch and Geoffrey William Bromiley, 43–44. Vol. 1. Grand Rapids: Wm. B. Eerdmans, 1999.

External links

 "Amen" from the Catechism of the Catholic Church
 Strong's Concordance H543
 Strong's Concordance G281

Christian prayer
Hebrew words and phrases in the Hebrew Bible
Interjections
New Testament Hebrew words and phrases
Religious terminology
Hebrew words and phrases in Jewish prayers and blessings
Redirects from closing lines